Caligo brasiliensis, the Brazilian owl, sulanus owl, or almond-eyed owl, is a butterfly of the family Nymphalidae. The species can be found in most of South America as various subspecies, including Brazil, Colombia, Venezuela and Ecuador. Its range extends through Trinidad, Honduras, Guatemala and Panama north to Mexico.

The larvae of the nominate subspecies have been recorded on Euterpe edulis, Musa species, and Hedychium coronarium. The larvae of subspecies sulanus have been recorded on Heliconia, Calathea, and Musa species.

Subspecies
Caligo brasiliensis brasiliensis (Brazil)
Caligo brasiliensis galba (Colombia)
Caligo brasiliensis caesius (Venezuela)
Caligo brasiliensis morpheus (Ecuador, Colombia)
Caligo brasiliensis minor (Trinidad)
Caligo brasiliensis sulanus (Honduras, Guatemala, Panama, Mexico)

References

External links
Caligo brasiliensis sulanus, Mariposas Mexicanas

Brasiliensis
Fauna of Brazil
Nymphalidae of South America
Taxa named by Baron Cajetan von Felder
Butterflies described in 1862